The Grenada Football Association (GFA) is the governing body of football in Grenada. It oversees the Grenada national football team.

In club football, it oversees the GFA Premier League, GFA First Division and GFA Second Division. It also oversees Grenada's top football cup competition, the GFA Super Knockout Cup.

Association staff

Logos

See also 
Football in Grenada

References

External links
 
 Grenada on FIFA.com
 Grenada at CONCACAF site

Grenada
Football in Grenada
Football
1924 establishments in Grenada
Sports organizations established in 1924